Kirill Isachenko (born 23 April 1997) is a Belarusian professional footballer who plays for Traktor Minsk.

Career
In 2019, Kirill joined Lubuszanin Trzcianka in Poland.

References

External links 
 
 

1997 births
Living people
Belarusian footballers
Belarusian expatriate footballers
Expatriate footballers in the Czech Republic
Association football midfielders
FC Oshmyany players
MFK Karviná players
FC Torpedo Minsk players
FC Krumkachy Minsk players
FC Orsha players
FC Traktor Minsk players
Expatriate footballers in Poland